The Blue Room may refer to:

Music
 The Blue Room (EP), a 1999 EP by Coldplay
 The Blue Room (Madeleine Peyroux album), 2013
 The Blue Room (album), a 2000 album by Union
 The Blue Room (soundtrack), a 2010 soundtrack album from Arthur Loves Plastic

Other uses
 The Blue Room (play), a 1998 play by David Hare
 The Blue Room (2002 film), a Mexican-Spanish film
 The Blue Room (2014 film), a French film
 The Blue Room (Picasso), a 1901 painting by Pablo Picasso
 The Blue Room (Valadon), a 1923 painting by Suzanne Valadon
 The Blue Room (novel) (La chambre bleue), a 1964 mystery novel by Georges Simenon
 The Blue Room, a UK music show on BBC Radio 1
 The Blue Room, a Kansas City jazz venue in the 18th and Vine District
 The Blue Room, an art venue for homosexuals in Singapore
 The Blue Room, an airport lounge of Virgin Blue (now Virgin Australia)

See also
 Blue Room (disambiguation)